Emma Black (née Fernon; born 12 March 1987) is a Scottish female international football defender who plays for Celtic in the Scottish Women's Premier League (SWPL1). During her international career, Black earned 40 caps and scored once for the Scotland women's national football team.

Club career
Black began her career with Glasgow City as a striker, before subsequently converting to defence. She has currently helped the club win seven successive Scottish Women's Premier League titles, adding to a previous success in 2004–05, and has participated in the UEFA Women's Champions League where she became the club's first ever European goalscorer when she netted against Athletic Bilbao, in August 2006.

Black retired from playing in 2015 to concentrate on raising a family. However, she returned to playing in January 2018 when she signed for Motherwell, who had appointed her partner Eddie Wolecki Black. In December 2018 she signed for Celtic.

International career
Black captained the Scotland under-19 side before making her debut for the senior side in August 2009, against the Netherlands as second-half substitute for Kirsty McBride. She scored her first international goal in a friendly against Northern Ireland in May 2010.

International goals
Results list Scotland's goal tally first

References

External links
Emma Black profile Scottish FA
Emma Black profile Glasgow City FC

1987 births
Living people
Scottish women's footballers
Scotland women's international footballers
Glasgow City F.C. players
Women's association football defenders
Motherwell L.F.C. players
Celtic F.C. Women players